Kelleytown is an unincorporated community in Henry County, Georgia, United States. Kelleytown is within the postal limits of McDonough and as such, most residents list McDonough as their city. The community is located eight miles (13 km) northeast of the historic downtown McDonough Square. The community has produced many prominent Henry Countians including Congressmen, a mayor, commissioners, judges, attorneys, politicians, educators, and many professional, highly respected businessmen and women.

History

Kelleytown (known in the early 20th century as Kelleystown) is an unincorporated center whose inhabitants made many worthwhile contributions to Henry County history. The names Chafin, Crumbley, Elliott, Owen, Hightower, Phillips, and Thompson figure prominently in the community.  It is from the Kelley family, one of Henry County's founding families, that Kelleytown Community and Kelley Presbyterian Church derived their names.  The 1850 Henry County Census notes ten people with the Kelley surname.

White House Community became established around the homestead of a first settler Silas Moseley, and Kelleytown Community around that of his brother Benjamin Moseley (1787–1851).  Reuben Kelley (1800–1875), another first settler of Henry County, married Mary Moseley (1807–1895), a daughter of Benjamin, and settled nearby.  According to land ownership records and census data, Reuben Kelley was originally from Greene County.  Their old homestead remains in a dilapidated state off of Kelleytown Road, and the original Kelley family graveyard is in the back of the property.  There are ten graves, including three that are unmarked.  All the monuments have fallen from their bases and are weatherworn.

Several of the Kelleys served in the Confederate States Army during the American Civil War.  Thomas Hughey Kelley (1832–1865), son of Reuben and Mary, enlisted March 6, 1862 and served in Company I of the 44th Regiment, Georgia Volunteer Infantry, Doles-Cook Brigade, Army of Northern Virginia, of the Confederate States Army.  At the time of the War he was in his mid-30s and had a wife and three young children at home.  He was captured at the Battle of Spotsylvania Court House on May 10, 1864, and held prisoner at Fort Delaware where he died of disease contracted in the prison.  He is buried in Finns Point National Cemetery in New Jersey.

Captain Henry Holcombe Kelley (1834–1910) married Alice Cloud Elliott and they lived and reared their family at the crossroads at Kelleytown.  The couple had four children: son, Thomas Cloud (1869–1963) and daughters Kate, Maude, and Elon. Kate married Edgar Owen, Maude married Henry Owen, and Elon married Manse Crumbley.   All continued to live in Kelleytown.  Henry was one of Henry County's prominent and most widely known citizens.  A June 1885 issue of The Henry County Weekly proclaims that "H.H. Kelley has the best patch of cotton in his district."  He was a confederate veteran, and during the Civil War commanded a company in the Nineteenth Georgia Regiment.  Another article in The Henry County Weekly states, "Beneath the giant oaks that form the beautiful grove near Mr. Henry Kelley's home on the 8th day of August 1900, was held the reunion of Company B, 2nd Georgia Battalion, Georgia Reserves.  This was the first time these comrades had met since they parted more than 30 years ago."

As such, he was respected as a progressive businessman in Henry County. He took an active interest in the welfare and further building of the County in all areas for most of his life. He was a public-spirited man, having formerly served as commissioner from 1917-1920. He was a Freemason, and a charter member of the old White House Masonic Lodge.

John Thompson (1803–1881) and wife Jane Elliott (1807–1879) lived at Benjamin Moseley's old home.
W.F. Chafin (1840–1908) a member of a large Henry County family lived nearby, and members of his family became allies with the Kelleys.  L.P. Owen (1848–1921) and wife Elizabeth Crumbley lived there and were the parents of the Kelleytown Owens.

Politics
Descendants of the original Kelleytown families have long been involved in shaping Henry County. E. Quillian Owen, son of LP and Elizabeth Owen, was elected Sheriff of Henry County in 1944. He served in that capacity until his death in 1959. For many of those years, Sheriff Owen was the ONLY county law enforcement officer. In the county election of 1956, the voters of Loves District, as it was then called, gave Quillian 100% of the votes cast.  Bud Kelley served as a Henry County Commissioner from 1969 to 1976. Under his capacity as a commissioner, Bud helped influence the idea of building Henry Medical Center (at the time, many in the community thought the notion of building a hospital in Henry County as unnecessary and too expensive). Bud Kelley is credited with improving race relations in Henry County and, in 1972, appointed the first African American to serve on the County Planning and Zoning Board. Alex Crumbley, a successful McDonough attorney, was a Superior Court Judge in the Flint Circuit from 1978–83, and Georgia State Senator from 1986-1988.

Today this continues with James Troy Chafin III, a lawyer and retired United States Air Force pilot, who won the Democratic Primary and ran against Republican Mac Collins for United States Congress in 1996. He served as a Judge of the State Court of Henry County. Rudy Kelley is the longtime Mayor of the City of Stockbridge, Georgia.  Wade Crumbley, younger brother of Alex, was the county attorney for Henry County and served as special master in the State Bar of Georgia disciplinary proceedings from 1995-1999. He was appointed Superior Court Judge of the Flint Circuit by Georgia Governor Sonny Perdue in 2005.  Alex and Wade Crumbley  are the only brothers to have served as Superior Court judges in recent Georgia history and perhaps ever. Many of the Kelley, Crumbley,  Moseley, Chafin, Thompson, Elliott and other early families still live and work in Henry County.

Kelleytown is also currently the home to Johnny B Basler, previous District 5 Commissioner of the Henry County Board of Commissioners who served 1 term from 2006-2010.  Commissioner Basler and his wife own Biscuits and Brunch restaurant in Stockbridge.  Commissioner Basler has been credited with the purchase of over 100 acres of county park land for passive use in the Kelleytown area.  Additionally, Commissioner Basler secured SPLOST funding for a Fairview Police Precinct, Library, and recreation center.

Another political Kelleytown family has the surname of Davis.  Representative Steve Davis (R-Kelleytown), served four terms (2004–2012) as an elected member of the Georgia House of Representatives.  Representative Davis lives in Crown River subdivision just north of Big Cotton Indian Creek in Kelleytown with his wife and three children.  Representative Davis is best known for his support and fight for personal property rights and sponsoring Georgia's historical eminent domain bill and his fight against the expansion of mass transit into the Atlanta suburbs.  Representative Davis served on six committees in the Georgia House: State Institutions & Property, Transportation, Insurance, Appropriations, the Secretary of State Planning & Community Affairs, and as chairman of the Information and Audits Committee.  He has been credited with leading the charge in securing funds for the first technical college in Henry County, the Southern Crescent Technical College campus in McDonough as well as funding for the much needed widening of I-75 to be completed in 2015.

Ryan Davis, son of Representative Davis, was elected to the Henry County School Board on November 2, 2010 (2010-2014).  Ryan is a 2007 honor graduate of Union Grove High School, a 2010 graduate of Georgia Southern University with a BBA in Finance, and he graduated summa cum laude in 2012 with a Masters of Science in Management with an emphasis in healthcare management.  Ryan is said to be the youngest school board member in the history of Henry County taking office at the age of 21 and he was the youngest elected official in Georgia for two years.  Ryan's plan of action for improving education in Henry County included ending teacher furloughs (accomplished in his first two years), open access for District 5 students to the Advance Studies Academy in McDonough (accomplished in his first two years), a common sense approach to discipline, better cooperation and relationships with the state, and maintaining funds for band, chorus, art, PE, and high school athletics.  Ryan Davis did not seek reelection and has since married and moved out of Henry County.

Pleasant Grove School

When the original schoolhouse near Kelleytown Road burned, the Pleasant Grove School was built on the same site.  Even in the new building there were no indoor bathrooms, drinking water was drawn from a well, and the building was heated by a potbellied stove.

It was a private school, but the residents of Kelleytown would help pay for anyone that wanted to attend and couldn't afford tuition.  Grades 1-3 were in one room, and grades 4-6 were in another.  The school only went through ninth grade, and then the students transferred to another school in McDonough.  The school closed in 1951.

Kelley Presbyterian Church

The Kelley Presbyterian Church came into being as a result of a small Sunday school group which had been meeting since 1896.  Its meeting place was the one-room Kelleytown Schoolhouse located across the street from where the church was later built.  In November 1899 Reverend W.P. Hemphill, Evangelist of Atlanta Presbytery, assisted by Reverend J.B. Mack, conducted a series of services there.  Three of the people who attended those services united with the church universal as an immediate result.  They were Henry Holcombe Kelley, Mrs. T.C. Kelley, and Henry Franklin Green. 
 
On the first Sunday in January 1900, the Kelley Presbyterian Church was officially organized.  Ten charter members were enrolled on that day: Henry Holcombe Kelley, Mrs. T.C. Kelley, Henry Franklin Green, Samuel Patterson Green, Henry Clay Stephens (a carpenter who built many of the houses in Kelleytown and Stockbridge), Miss Evie Stephens, Mrs. Glance Farrar, Dr. Maston Evans Berry, Mr. and Mrs. Jack McDaniel.

Before the end of 1900, a church was built on land donated by Henry Holcombe Kelley, and  adjoining had been purchased for use as a cemetery.  The church is located at 3637 Airline Road.  The original clapboard meeting house was renovated with brick veneer and enlarged in 1941, with further additions added in 1962.  Elizabeth Mathis Cheatham generously donated an outdoor pavilion to the church in 1992.  The pavilion has been home to many homecomings and get-togethers at the church.  Bud Kelley furnished water to the church for 13 years when the church's well was dry.

In 1997 Kelley was named "Small Church of the Year" for the Presbytery of Greater Atlanta and in Georgia by the Synod of South Atlantic.  One of the reasons for this distinction includes the "Dogwood Tree Project" of the Kelley Presbyterian Men.  Since 1996 over 500 pink dogwoods have been given to new residents moving into the community.  The Presbyterian Women have distinguished themselves in the past few years by sewing eight inspiring banners for worship and creating nearly 100 exquisite Christian ornaments.  Both of these projects will remain as treasures to the congregation for generations to come.

The church marked its 100th anniversary on April 12, 2000.  Throughout the century, Kelley has been noted for its strong lay leadership among its women and men.  Brothers Vic and Manse Crumbley were known for their Sunday school teaching and superintendent skills. Many aspiring student preachers from Columbia Seminary have preached at Kelley Church, and lore of the church holds that famous theologian Peter Marshall preached at Kelley Church while a student,  and that he traveled to Kelleytown to observe these  brothers in action. The first women elders were Margaret Crumbley and Betty Latimer.

Two women of note who provided more than four decades of leadership in music were Annie Ruth Owen and Ruth Foster.  Foster was also a dedicated teacher of the catechism.  She was instrumental in establishing the Ruth Foster Educational Trust fund, which has provided more than twenty $1,000 college scholarships.

Kelley also distinguishes itself by including children and young people in its entire corporate life.  A nursery is provided for the youngest infants, but children and babies are welcomed and included in worship and social gatherings.

Since Kelley's first year, the congregation has been the hub and center of Kelleytown.  All the activities of the area revolved around its modest facilities, and its members are known for their hospitality and concern for individuals in need.  In 1950, an article in the Atlanta Constitution described Kelley as "one of the landmarks in the state, for no strictly rural church in Georgia is credited with a more complete program for community service."

Kelley Chapel Baptist Church
The Kelley Chapel Baptist Church began as a brush arbor in the late 19th century on Henry Kelley's plantation.  It was a place for the African American population of Kelleytown to gather and worship.  Two ministers, one Baptist and one Methodist, led the small congregation.

Henry Kelley eventually decided to donate the land to the group, and Kelley Chapel Baptist Church was formally organized in 1884.  The black people of Kelleytown were much like extended family to their white neighbors, and were very much respected.  Some blacks became tenant farmers and partnered in work with whites.  For example, Thomas Jackson was like a brother to James Troy  Chafin, Sr., and he was the only person that Chafin wanted by his side on his deathbed.  Other notable African Americans who lived in Kelleytown included Cora Albert, Clerie Usher Walker, Eddie Bryant(Boy Trip), Jeanette and Zeke Reed, Eddie Jackson, Love Jackson, and Henry Walker and his wife, Lizziebeth.

There was a closeness between Kelley Chapel and Kelley Presbyterian.  The churches would often share literature and other materials.  In Kelleytown, whenever someone had something that others didn't, it was shared without a second thought.

Kelley Chapel Baptist Church is located at 3351 Airline Road in McDonough.

The Kelleytown General Store and Henry County's first drive-in theater

The original Kelleytown general store is still standing, and is located at the corner of Airline and Kelleytown Roads.  The store was built in 1908 by Edgar Owen and was later operated by Manse Crumbley.  When the foundation was dug for the store, the red clay removed was then used to make the blocks to build the store.  Manse Crumbley was a quite a dynamic man; he also served as postmaster, doctor, dentist, vet, and accountant to the Kelleytown community.  Mail was delivered to the store and was sorted for residents.  The store remained in operation until 1966.  Bud and Jean Kelley opened a modern gas station and grocery store across the street from the original store around 1963. 

One of the most interesting parts of the original store was the white makeshift "movie screen" that was painted on the side of the building.  P.E. Ausband, a Kelleytown resident who worked for Monogram Pictures in Atlanta, would bring movie reels home and project them onto the outdoor screen (he borrowed electricity from a nearby house).  The movies were shown at no charge, and people would pull their mules and wagons up the driveway and wait for the sun to go down.  This began Henry County's first drive-in theater.  James Chafin, Bud Kelley, Owen Chafin, and Sarah Hightower fondly recall lying on their stomachs in the grass watching exciting Western movies.

In the late 1990s, Sarah Hightower and John Gilbert, a filmmaker with the Henry County Arts Alliance, revived the tradition for a couple of weekends.  They showed the black-and-white classics "Abbott and Costello Meet Frankenstein" and "The Marx Brothers' Coconuts."  More than 350 people came with chairs, blankets, and picnic baskets to watch the films.

Dr. J.G. Smith and Kelleytown's power plant

In 1918, Dr. J.G. Smith developed plans for a hydroelectric generating power plant on Cotton Indian Creek at Kelleytown.  The cost of the project was $100,000.  The water that powered the plant was diverted from the course of Cotton Indian Creek by Smith's Dam just east of Crumbley Road.  From this point the water traveled one mile (1.6 km) through a race to the Power House at Airline Road.  Thanks to Dr. Smith, homes in Kelleytown had power before McDonough!

Dr. Smith lived on Macon Street in downtown McDonough, and is recognized as having contributed more to the development of McDonough than any other individual in its history.  He established McDonough's first water system.  In addition to a successful medical practice (he was County physician), he owned the first Chevrolet dealership in Henry County and the local ice company.  Most importantly, he installed a steam engine and electric generator near the McDonough Depot that provided the people of McDonough with their first electric street lights.

The concrete turbine shafts from the power plant are still visible today from the modern bridge on Airline Road (near the present-day Crown River and Cotton Creek subdivisions).

Edgar Owen's waterwheel
In 1916, Edgar Owen built a dam, cotton gin, and gristmill on his Camp Creek property at the Henry and Rockdale county line. In the process, Kelleytown's most famous landmark, a huge over-shot waterwheel was created. The wheel was a favorite gathering spot for picnics, barbecues, and frolics. The cool, shady shoals around the mill were a favorite swimming and sunbathing spot.

Unfortunately, only a year later, Edgar Owen's overall suspenders became entangled with the equipment at the waterwheel, causing his untimely death.

The waterwheel was eventually dismantled in 1966 and moved to Stone Mountain Park.

A large portrait of the waterwheel currently hangs in Henry Medical Center.

Geography
Kelleytown is located at  (33.53761, -84.08905).

Major highways
 Georgia State Route 20
 Georgia State Route 155
 Georgia State Route 138

Demographics
Kelleytown is within the postal limits of McDonough and as such, most residents list McDonough as their city.

Sources
De l'Etoile, Martha Ann Moore (1992). The Kelleys of Kelleytown. Griffin.
Ide, S. Diane. "Remembering Kelleytown." Henry Magazine Apr.-May 2004: 15-22.
Moore, Joseph Henry Hightower (1993). First Families of Henry County, Georgia. Fernandina Beach: Wolfe Publishing. 
Morris, Gene, Jr. (2000). True Southerners: A Pictorial History of Henry County, Georgia. McDonough: The Henry County Record Publishers.
Rainer, Vessie Thrasher (1971). Henry County, Georgia: The Mother of Counties. McDonough.
Kelley Presbyterian Church Records
Henry County Obituaries (1908–1929)
Confederate Soldier Obituaries (1879–1943)

References

External links
City of McDonough
Crown River Subdivision
Cotton Creek Subdivision

Unincorporated communities in Henry County, Georgia
Unincorporated communities in Georgia (U.S. state)